Diptychophora is a genus of moths of the Crambidae (grass moth) family.

Species
 Diptychophora ardalia Landry & Becker, 2021
 Diptychophora calliptera Tams, 1935
 Diptychophora desmoteria Meyrick, 1931
 Diptychophora diasticta Gaskin, 1986
 Diptychophora galvani Landry & Becker, 2021
 Diptychophora harlequinalis Barnes & McDunnough, 1914
 Diptychophora huixtla Landry, 1990
 Diptychophora incisalis Dyar, 1925
 Diptychophora kuhlweinii Zeller, 1866
 Diptychophora kuphitincta Lucas, 1898
 Diptychophora lojanalis (Dognin, 1905)
 Diptychophora minimalis Hampson, 1919
 Diptychophora mitis Meyrick, 1931
 Diptychophora muscella Fryer, 1912
 Diptychophora planaltina Landry & Becker, 2021
 Diptychophora powelli Landry, 1990
 Diptychophora subazanalis Bleszynski, 1967

Former species
Diptychophora minutalis Hampson, 1893
Diptychophora strigatalis Hampson, 1900

References

Diptychophorini
Crambidae genera
Taxa named by Philipp Christoph Zeller